Debir Shadab (also Romanized as Debīr Shādāb) is a village in Hamaijan Rural District, Hamaijan District, Sepidan County, Fars Province, Iran. At the 2006 census, its population was 126, in 26 families.

References 

Populated places in Sepidan County